Plac Wilsona (English: Wilson Square) is a station on Line M1 of the Warsaw Metro. It is located below Wilson Square in the Żoliborz district in northern Warsaw.

The station was opened on 20 December 2003 as the northern terminus of the extension from Dworzec Gdański. On 29 December 2006 the line was extended further north to Marymont as shuttle service, and on 20 March 2008 as normal service.

On 7 April 2008 during the Metrorail convention it won a Metro award for the best recently constructed station. It was designed by Polish architect Andrzej M. Chołdzyński.

Gallery

See also
 Plac Wilsona

References

External links

Railway stations in Poland opened in 2005
Line 1 (Warsaw Metro) stations
Żoliborz
Buildings and monuments honoring American presidents in Poland